Aleksandr Belyavskiy may refer to:
 Aleksandr Belyavsky (actor) (1932–2012), Russian actor
 Aleksandrs Beļavskis (born 1964), Latvian ice hockey player
 Alexander Beliavsky (born 1953), Slovenian chess player of Ukrainian origin